Slim Amamou ( (born 1977) is a Tunisian blogger and a former Secretary of State for Sport and Youth in the transitional Tunisian government of early 2011. He resigned from the role in the week of 25 May 2011 in protest of the transitional government's censorship of several websites.

Early life and education
Amamou studied at the University of Sousse. He is a blogger and author of ReadWriteWeb France.

Political career
He protested against censorship in Tunisia and organized a demonstration on 22 May 2010.

He was arrested on 6 January 2011 during the protests that led to the Tunisian Revolution, alongside others including Azyz Amami. The Anonymous hacktivist group had led attacks on the Tunisian government's websites, and Amamou was held for five days by the state security forces under the suspicion of having collaborated with the hackers. Following a mass internet campaign and protest, Amamou and other bloggers were released from government custody.

Amamou was later released, and, following the flight of Zine El Abidine Ben Ali, a national unity government was formed. Amamou was invited to become Secretary of State for Sport and Youth in that government on 17 January 2011. When he assumed the role he told television channel France 2 that he would resign from his role if the government started to interfere with the internet, such as using internet censorship. He received considerable criticism online for joining the transitional government, particularly from fellow bloggers and internet activists.

In his role as Secretary of State for Youth and Sports, he was subordinate to the Minister for Youth and Sports, Mohamed Aloulou. On 29 March 2011, he was expelled from the Tunisian Pirate Party for joining the transitional national unity government. He later joined a rival party, the Pirate Party of Tunisia, instead.

On the week of May 25, he resigned from his post in protest of the transitional government's censorship of several websites at the request of the Tunisian Army.

Political positions
He supports the legalisation of cannabis in Tunisia. He is an advocate for network neutrality and opposes internet censorship.

See also
2010–2011 Tunisian revolution
Operation Tunisia, which gave Amamou software to spread during the revolution

References

External links
 Amamou's blog, NoMemorySpace
 Interview with Amamou broadcast on Radio France Internationale
 

Tunisian bloggers
Tunisian activists
Tunisian Pirate Party politicians
Living people
Prisoners and detainees of Tunisia
Government ministers of Tunisia
1977 births
People of the Tunisian Revolution
University of Sousse alumni